My Little Sister can refer to:

 My Little Sister (1919 film), an American silent film
 My Little Sister (2020 film), a Swiss drama film